Flyblow Creek is a  long 2nd order tributary to the Stinking River in Pittsylvania County, Virginia.

Course 
Flyblow Creek rises about 1 mile west of Renan, Virginia and then flows south-southeast to join the Stinking River about 1 mile southwest of Mt. Airy.

Watershed 
Flyblow Creek drains  of area, receives about 45.2 in/year of precipitation, has a wetness index of 444.52, and is about 50% forested.

See also 
 List of Virginia Rivers

References 

Rivers of Virginia
Rivers of Pittsylvania County, Virginia
Tributaries of the Roanoke River